InterLAN is a Romanian Internet Exchange association founded in 2005 in Bucharest, Romania. Since 2008, Interlan is a member of the Euro-IX Organisation and since 2015 a member of RIPE NCC. In October 2014 InterLAN hosted The 25th Euro-IX Forum and in November 2015 the RIPE 71 Meeting.

POP's

Interlan has several POP's in Romania and one in Frankfurt, Germany:
 NXDATA-1, 8, Dimitrie Pompeiu Blvd., Feper building, 3rd floor, Bucharest, 2nd district, Romania
 NXDATA-2, 6-A, Dimitrie Pompeiu  Blvd., IEMI Building, ground floor, Bucharest, 2nd district, Romania
 Drumul Taberei area, Bucharest, 2nd district, Romania
 Constanta, Romania
 Timișoara, Romania
 Craiova, Romania
 Equinix Frankfurt KleyerStrasse (FR5), Kleyerstrasse 90, Frankfurt 60326, Germany

Available ports

Available ports are:
 100 Mbit/s copper
 1 Gbit/s copper/fiber
 10 Gbit/s fiber
One or more ports can be aggregated, for example two ports x 1 Gbit/s

Participants

Interlan has 62 traffic participants:

DNS root servers
 J-root Verisign

External links
 Interlan IX Official Site

References

Internet exchange points in Europe
Telecommunications organizations